Working may refer to:

 Work (human activity), intentional activity people perform to support themselves, others, or the community

Arts and media
 Working (musical), a 1978 musical
 Working (TV series), an American sitcom
 Working (Caro book), a 2019 book by Robert Caro
 Working (Terkel book), a 1974 book by Studs Terkel
 Working!!, a manga by Karino Takatsu
 "Working" (song), by Tate McRae and Khalid, 2021

Engineering and technology
 Cold working or cold forming, the shaping of metal below its recrystallization temperature
 Hot working, the shaping of metal above its recrystallization temperature
 Multiple working, having more than one locomotive under the control of one driver
 Live-line working, the maintenance of electrical equipment while it is energised
 Single-line working, using one train track out of two

Other uses
 Holbrook Working (1895–1985), statistician and economist
 Working the system, exploiting rules and procedures for unintended or abusive effects
 A working, being a series of occult rituals

See also
Workin' (disambiguation)
 Work (disambiguation)
 Works (disambiguation)